is a train station in the town of Kawanehon, Haibara District, Shizuoka Prefecture, Japan, operated by the Ōigawa Railway.

Lines

Station layout
The station has an island platforms serving two tracks connected to a small station building by a level crossing. The station is staffed.

Adjacent stations

|-
!colspan=5|Ōigawa Railway

Station history
Okuizumi Station was opened on August 1, 1959.

Passenger statistics
In fiscal 2017, the station was used by an average of 36 passengers daily (boarding passengers only).

Surrounding area
Oi River

See also
 List of Railway Stations in Japan

References

External links

 Ōigawa Railway home page

Stations of Ōigawa Railway
Railway stations in Shizuoka Prefecture
Railway stations in Japan opened in 1959
Kawanehon, Shizuoka